Byfield may refer to:

Places 
 Byfield, Massachusetts, USA
 Byfield, Northamptonshire, England
 Byfield, Queensland, Australia
 Byfield National Park, Queensland, Australia
 Byfield Historic District

People 
 Adoniram Byfield (died 1660), English clergyman
 Allan George Richard Byfield (born 1913), Jamaican politician
 Althea Byfield (born 1982), Jamaican basketball and netball player
 Arnold Byfield (1923–2015), Australian cricketer and footballer
 Barbara Ninde Byfield (1930–1988), American author and illustrator
 Bruce Byfield (born 1958), Canadian journalist
 Darren Byfield (born 1976), British footballer
 Debbie Byfield (born 1954), Jamaican sprinter
 Ernie Byfield (1889–1950), American hotelier and restaurateur
 Link Byfield (1951–2015), Canadian news columnist
 Mary Byfield (1795–1871), English artist 
 Nicholas Byfield (1579–1622), English clergyman
 Quinton Byfield (born 2002), Canadian ice hockey player
 Richard Byfield (c.1598–1664), English clergyman
 Shadrack Byfield (1789-1850), British soldier and author
 Ted Byfield (1928-2021), Canadian journalist
 Zig Byfield (1943–2017), British actor

English-language surnames